Penny Pennington (born October 24, 1963) is an American businesswoman. She became the managing partner of Edward Jones Investments as of January 1, 2019.

Early life and education 
Penny Pennington was born in Nashville, Tennessee. She received a bachelor's degree in commerce with a concentration in finance from the University of Virginia and an MBA from Kellogg School of Management at Northwestern University.

Career 
Pennington started her career with Edward Jones Investments in 2000 as a financial advisor in Livonia, Michigan. She was named a principal and moved to the company's St. Louis, Missouri headquarters in 2006. After her move to St. Louis, Pennington took on several senior leadership roles at Edward Jones. She served as a board member on the Edward Jones Trust Co. and on the executive, management and audit committees. Beginning in 2015, she was head of the client strategies group; overseeing products/services delivered to clients and research, trading and marketing.

Pennington is on the board of the Edward Jones Trust Company, a member of Edward Jones’ executive, management and audit committees and she is a senior executive sponsor of the firm's lesbian, gay, bisexual, transgender and ally (LGBTA) Business Resource Group.

Philanthropy 
Pennington is on the boards of Donald Danforth Plant Science Center; Shakespeare Festival St. Louis; Saint Louis Fashion Fund; United Way of Greater St. Louis  and Whitaker Foundation.  She is also a co-chair of the Forest Park Forever 2019 Women's Committee and 29th Annual Hat Luncheon. Pennington also is on the boards of the Federal Reserve Bank of St. Louis, the Washington University in St. Louis Board of Trustees and the Executive Committee of the Chair’s Council for Greater St. Louis.

Personal life 
Pennington is married to Mike Fidler and they have two grown children.

References 

1963 births
Living people
21st-century American businesswomen
21st-century American businesspeople
American financial businesspeople
McIntire School of Commerce alumni
Kellogg School of Management alumni
Washington University in St. Louis people